Mary Stewart is a five-act play written in Scots by the Scottish playwright Robert McLellan and produced in Glasgow in 1951 by the Citizens Theatre. The next production of the play took place in August 2014 at the Edinburgh Fringe, performed by Theatre Alba. Mary Stewart follows the life of the eponymous Mary, Queen of Scots.

References 

1951 plays
Cultural depictions of Mary, Queen of Scots
Plays based on real people
Scottish plays